Past continuous may refer to:
Past continuous or past progressive, an English verb form (e.g. was writing)
Verb forms with similar meaning in some other languages; see Imperfect
Past Continuous, a novel by Yaakov Shabtai
Past Continuous, a novel by Neel Mukherjee

See also
Past tense
Continuous and progressive aspects

Linguistics disambiguation pages